Elizabeth Fisher may refer to:

Beth Fisher (artist) (born 1944), American artist
Elizabeth Bland, née Fisher, Hebrew scholar
Elizabeth F. Fisher (1873–1941), American geologist
Elizabeth Gault Fisher (1909–2000), American entomologist
Elizabeth Holmes Fisher (1867–1955), American art collector
Elizabeth Fisher (figure skater), Canadian figure skater
Elizabeth Fisher (neuroscientist), British neuroscientist
Elizabeth Fisher, a character in Gossip Girl
Elizabeth Taylor (1932–2011), married name Fisher, actress
Zachary and Elizabeth Fisher, founders of the Fisher House Foundation

See also
Betty Fisher (disambiguation)
Fisher (surname)